Arctodiamesa is a genus of non-biting midges in the subfamily Diamesinae of the bloodworm family Chironomidae.

Species
The genus includes the following species:

 A. amurensis Makarchenko, 2007
 A. appendiculata (Lundström, 1915)
 A. breviramosa Makarchenko, 1995
 A. marinae Makarchenko, 2005

References

Chironomidae